Decature Poindexter "Dick" Jones (May 22, 1902 – August 2, 1994) was a Major League Baseball pitcher who played for the Washington Senators in  and .

External links

1902 births
1994 deaths
Major League Baseball pitchers
Baseball players from Mississippi
People from Meadville, Mississippi